Paul Roe (born 21 November 1959 - 5 October 2019) was a Canadian soccer player who spent five years in the North American Soccer League and one in the Major Indoor Soccer League. He also played in Canada's National Soccer League, the American Indoor Soccer Association, the American Soccer League and the American Professional Soccer League.

Roe represented Canada at the U20 level six times. He played for Toronto Metros-Croatia in 1978 before getting released in June 1979. After his release, Roe was quickly picked up by the Edmonton Drillers and won an NASL indoor title in 1980–81 with them. Roe spent the summer of 1981 with the Hamilton Steelers, who won the NSL title. The following season, 1981–82, he was an indoor runner up with the Tampa Bay Rowdies.

Roe was born in Manchester, England. He was the younger brother of Canadian international soccer player, Peter Roe.

See also
Peter Roe (soccer)

References

External links
NASL/MISL/ASL stats

1955 births
Footballers from Manchester
American Indoor Soccer Association players
American Professional Soccer League players
American Soccer League (1988–89) players
Edmonton Drillers (1979–1982) players
English emigrants to Canada
Expatriate soccer players in the United States
Canadian expatriate sportspeople in the United States
Canadian expatriate soccer players
Canadian soccer players
Canada men's youth international soccer players
Canadian National Soccer League players
Hamilton Steelers (1981–1992) players
Major Indoor Soccer League (1978–1992) players
Naturalized citizens of Canada
North American Soccer League (1968–1984) indoor players
North American Soccer League (1968–1984) players
Soccer people from Ontario
People from Brampton
Tacoma Stars players
Tampa Bay Rowdies (1975–1993) players
Toronto Blizzard (1971–1984) players
Association football utility players
Association football forwards
2019 deaths